Stefan Tripković may refer to:

Stefan Tripković (footballer, born 1993), Serbian association football player who plays for FK Sloga Petrovac na Mlavi
Stefan Tripković (footballer, born 1994), Serbian association football player who plays for FK Voždovac